Furkan Bayrak (born November 19, 1995) competing in the 77 kg division of Greco-Roman wrestling. He is a member of the Ankara ASKI Spor Club.

Career 
Furkan Bayrak won a gold medal at the 2014 FILA Junior World Wrestling Championship held in Croatia's capital, Zagreb.

In 2017, Bayrak captured the silver medal at the Islamic Solidarity Games in Azerbaijan.

In 2022, he won one of the bronze medals in the men's Greco-Roman 77 kg event at the 2021 Islamic Solidarity Games held in Konya, Turkey.

References

External links
 

Living people
Turkish male sport wrestlers
European Wrestling Championships medalists
Islamic Solidarity Games medalists in wrestling
Islamic Solidarity Games competitors for Turkey
1995 births
20th-century Turkish people
21st-century Turkish people